That Time of Year is a 2018 Danish comedy film directed by Paprika Steen. It was screened in the Contemporary World Cinema section at the 2018 Toronto International Film Festival.

Cast
 Sofie Gråbøl as Barbara
 Paprika Steen as Katrine
 Lars Brygmann as Torben
 Jacob Lohmann as Mads
 Lars Knutzon as Poul

References

External links
 

2018 films
2018 comedy films
Danish comedy films
2010s Danish-language films